Soma Holiday is the second release and the first studio album by American punk rock band the Proletariat. It was also the debut output for Radiobeat Records.

The record was named after the drug used to control society in Aldous Huxley's novel Brave New World.

Production and release
Produced by Jimmy Dufour, Lou Giordano and Frank Michaels, Soma Holiday was recorded and mixed at Radiobeat Studios in Boston, Massachusetts. Bill Kipper was in charge of the mastering of the album at Masterdisk in New York City.

The record includes the songs "Splendid Wars", "Events/Repeat", "Blind", and "Torn Curtain", which were originally featured on the band's debut EP Distortion, a limited edition seven-track cassette tape self-released the previous year.

Soma Holiday was originally co-released in 1983, as LP, on band's Non-U label and Radiobeat Records. A second pressing of the album would be released later that same year.

Critical reception
In a contemporary review of the album, Joyce Millman, music critic at The Boston Phoenix, wrote:

Around the same time, Jeff Bale from Maximumrocknroll, was of the view that:

Distortion EP

Distortion is a seven-song EP and the first stand-alone release by the Proletariat. It was issued in July 1982 on the band's own label, Non-U Records, as a limited edition single-sided C46 cassette tape.

The EP is composed of songs recorded in three separate sessions at Radiobeat Studios in Boston, Massachusetts with producer Jimmy Dufour: "After the Rise" was recorded in November 1981 with Jimmy Johnson as audio engineer, "Westernization" was engineered by Dufour himself in January 1982, whereas the rest of the tracks were laid down in March 1982 with recording engineer Lou Giordano.

The songs "Torn Curtain", "Splendid Wars", "Blind", and "Events/Repeat" would be re-released the following year on the band's first studio album Soma Holiday.

The tracks "After the Rise", "White Hands", and "Westernization" would not be reissued until 1998, when they were included on the band's anthology Voodoo Economics and Other American Tragedies.

The cover and label art were designed by graphic artist Pickles. The insert liner notes sheet was created by Frank Michaels and Richard Brown. The EP's artwork includes a reproduction of Dorothea Lange's photo Migrant Mother (1936).

Track listing
Music, lyrics, and arrangements by the Proletariat.

Reissues
Long out of print in its original form, Soma Holiday was re-released, in its entirety, as part of the band's 2-CD anthology Voodoo Economics and Other American Tragedies, compiled in 1998 by Taang! Records.

In October 1999, apparently under license from the band, the album was reissued in cassette-only format, featuring alternate cover art, on Social Napalm Records, a small DIY label based in Chelmsford, Massachusetts.

On October 21, 2016, 33 years after its debut, Soma Holiday was re-released for the first time in its original vinyl format, on Sacramento-based label Ss Records; which also simultaneously released the album for the first time on CD.

Track listing
Music by Peter Bevilacqua and Frank Michaels, lyrics by Richard Brown, except where noted. Arrangements by the Proletariat.

Personnel

The Proletariat
 Richard Brown – vocals, cowbell (track A7)
 Frank Michaels – guitar, backing vocals
 Peter Bevilacqua – bass, backing vocals
 Tom McKnight – drums

Additional performers
 Mick Miller – backing vocals (A4)
 Lou Giordano – backing vocals (A9)
 Jimmy Dufour – backing vocals (A9)

Production
 Jimmy Dufour - production (A2, A5, B3, B5), co-production, co-engineering
 Lou Giordano - co-production, engineering (A2, A5, B3, B5), co-engineering
 Frank Michaels - co-production, sleeve concept
 Mick Miller – engineering (assistance)
 Bill Kipper – mastering
 Pickles – graphic design

Additional production (2016 remastered LP reissue)
 John Golden - remastering
 Dane Henas – graphic design (restoration)

Notes

References

Further reading
Magazines
 Millman, Joyce (October 25, 1983). "Cellars by starlight - Prole cats". The Boston Phoenix. sec. 3, pp. 6–7.
 Bale, Jeff (October–November 1983). "The Proletariat: Soma Holiday (LP)". Maximumrocknroll (9).
 Everbach, Tracy (November 17, 1983). "The Proletariat: Soma Holiday (Non-U/Radiobeat)". The Boston Globe Calendar.
 Leland, John (April 1984). "America Underground Reviews – The Proletariat: Soma Holiday (Non-U/Radiobeat, LP)". Trouser Press (96).
 Christgau, Robert (February 21, 1984). "Christgau's Consumer Guide - The Proletariat: Soma Holiday (Non-U/Radiobeat)". The Village Voice.
 Quint, Al (September 1982). "The Proletariat: Distortion (Cassette)". Suburban Punk (1).

External links
 "The Proletariat: Soma Holiday". The Proletariat.
 "The Proletariat: Distortion". The Proletariat.

Articles
 Scott, Tim (September 4, 2016). "How The Proletariat Became One Of the Most Incendiary Bands in Reagan’s America" (interview). Noisey.
 Sheppard, Oliver (October 5, 2016). "An interview with The Proletariat on their "Soma Holiday" reissue". Cvlt Nation.
Reviews
 Millman, Joyce (August 24, 1982). "Cellars by starlight – The dictatorship of the Proletariat" (review of the Distortion EP). The Boston Phoenix.
 Robbins, Ira (1983). "Proletariat". Trouser Press.
 Electric Sunshine (March 17, 2012). "Proletariat "Soma Holiday"". The Electric Sunshine.
 Neff, Joseph (October 25, 2016). "Graded on a Curve: The Proletariat, Soma Holiday". The Vinyl District.

The Proletariat albums
1983 albums